The 1990 Indianapolis Colts season was the 38th season for the team in the National Football League and seventh in Indianapolis. The Indianapolis Colts finished the National Football League's 1990 season with a record of 7 wins and 9 losses, and finished third in the AFC East division. Running back Eric Dickerson held out of training camp, during a contract dispute. The Colts suspended Dickerson four games for conduct detrimental to the team. He returned late in the season and rushed for 677 yards.

The Colts were embarrassed at home in week two by the putrid Patriots, losing 16–14 for New England's lone win of 1990.

On December 22, 1990, Monday Night Football was played two days early, on Saturday night. The 6–8 Colts played at home as underdogs against the Washington Redskins. Trailing 14–25 in the 4th quarter, rookie quarterback Jeff George led an improbable and spectacular comeback which included two touchdowns to tie the game with little time left. The Colts then intercepted Mark Rypien and returned the ball for the go-ahead touchdown. The Colts pulled off the upset in dramatic fashion with one of George's most memorable games of his career. He threw three touchdowns and no interceptions.

Offseason

NFL Draft

Personnel

Staff

Roster

Regular season

Schedule

Standings

Season summary

Week 1 at Bills

See also
History of the Indianapolis Colts
List of Indianapolis Colts seasons
Colts–Patriots rivalry

Indianapolis Colts
Indianapolis Colts seasons
Colts